Mary Bryant (1765 – after 1794) was a Cornish convict sent to Australia. She became one of the first successful escapees from the fledgling Australian penal colony.

Early life
Bryant was born Mary Broad (referred to as Mary Braund at the Exeter Assizes) in Lanlivery, Cornwall, United Kingdom, to William Broad and Dorothy Guilleff (or Gelef/Juileff). William Broad was a farmer who also leased and coppiced woodland with his brother Matthew. In July 1785, Mary Broad was committed to prison to await trial for highway robbery by the Mayor of Plymouth, England, where her sister Elizabeth was living. She, along with Catherine Fryer and Mary Hayden alias Shepherd, was convicted of having robbed and assaulted Agnes Lakeman on a road in Plymouth, stealing a silk bonnet valued at 12 pence, and other goods valued at £1 and 11 shillings. All three were sentenced to hang on 20 March 1786, which was commuted to seven years' transportation by the Judge. She was initially held in Exeter, before being moved to the Dunkirk prison hulk at Plymouth where she conceived her first child.

Transportation
In May 1787, Bryant was sent as a prisoner with the First Fleet aboard the ship Charlotte. Bryant gave birth on the journey to a baby, whom she called Charlotte Spence Broad. When she arrived in Australia, she married William Bryant on 10 February 1788. Bryant, who had been convicted for impersonating a seaman to receive some of the other man's wages, was also on the Dunkirk prison hulk and Charlotte with Mary and they later had a son, Emanuel, born on 6 May 1790.

William Bryant was a mariner. In early New South Wales, William was considered useful, and was put in charge of fishing. When he was caught selling fish on the side, he was given 100 lashes. Bryant's transportation order expired in March 1791. He made a plan to escape with others by boat.

Escape from the colony and recapture
On 28 March 1791 William and Mary Bryant, with her children, and seven transportees William Allen (who had been in the navy), James Martin, Samuel Bird alias John Simms, Samuel Broom alias John Butcher, James Cox alias Rolt, Nathaniel Lillie, and William Morton (an experienced navigator), left the colony by boat. Onboard they carried initial provisions of food and fresh water, as well as a fishing net. And had acquired a compass, quadrant, and chart, later said to have come from a Dutch sea captain of the Waaksamheyd at Port Jackson.

Initially they kept close to the coast, and stopped to replenish their supplies of water and food as they travelled North. Their planned route involved navigating the then uncharted Great Barrier Reef and the Torres Straits. After a voyage of sixty-nine days, the group reached Kupang, on the island of Timor, a journey of more than 5,000 kilometres. This voyage has often been compared with William Bligh's similar journey in an open boat only two years earlier, after the mutiny on the Bounty. Bligh's voyage had also ended in Timor. 

Timor was then under the control of the Dutch. The Bryants' party claimed to be shipwreck survivors. They were later discovered and imprisoned by the Dutch governor, then handed over to Captain Edward Edwards of HMS Pandora, which had been wrecked on the Great Barrier Reef.

During the voyage back, Mary lost William and both of her children, Emanuel and William dying at Batavia on the 1st and 22 December 1791, whilst Charlotte died on the last leg of the voyage on 6 May 1792. Morton and Bird also died, and Cox became a man overboard from the Horssen.

Mary Bryant, Allen, Broom alias John Butcher, Lillie, and Martin arrived back in England on 18 June 1792. The punishment for escaping from transportation was generally death, but following court hearings in London, they were all ordered to 'remain on their former sentence, until they should be discharged by course of law'. Their case was taken up by the biographer and lawyer, James Boswell. On 2 May 1793 Mary Bryant was pardoned, and she was released from Newgate prison, her sentence having expired, while Allen, Broom alias Butcher, Lillie, and Martin had to wait until 2 November 1793 to be released by proclamation. Bryant returned to her family in Cornwall, and Boswell provided her with £10 a year until his death in 1795.

In popular culture
The Bryant party's escape was the subject of a ten episode serial, written by Rex Rienits, broadcast by the Australian Broadcasting Commission during 1963. Mary Bryant was portrayed by Fay Kelton.

Bryant was the subject of a British/Australian television movie The Incredible Journey of Mary Bryant, with Romola Garai playing the eponymous role, Jack Davenport and Sam Neill. It was first screened in Australia on 30 October 2005 on Network Ten as a two 2-hour part series. It was screened in the UK over Easter weekend 2006 on ITV. It was not completely historically accurate.

She also featured heavily in Timberlake Wertenbaker's play Our Country's Good, which itself was based on Thomas Keneally's novel The Playmaker. Both centre on the first Australian settlers' decision to stage a performance of The Recruiting Officer, and the action ends just at the point of Bryant's escape. In the play, she is referred to by a nickname, Dabby Bryant.

The story was fictionalised by Rosa Jordan in her novel Far From Botany Bay, by Lesley Pearse in the novel Remember Me, and by Meg Keneally in Fled.

The Mary Bryant story also featured in Patrick Edgeworth's play Boswell for the Defence. A huge success in London in 1989, it starred Leo McKern.

A musical titled Mary Bryant was written by Nick Enright and was presented in Melbourne by Magnormos.

Mary Bryant was the subject of a one-woman theatre show, Oh Mary!, devised and directed by Bec Applebee and Simon Harvey (Kneehigh Theatre. It toured the UK in 2011.

Paul Marsh (of the Canberra Australia group "Coolibah Coolective") composed "Sixty Six Days In An Open Boat" to tell the story of Mary and her family's journey.

Books about Bryant
Causer, Tim (2017) Memorandoms by James Martin: An Astonishing Escape from Early New South Wales . London: UCL Press 
Cook, Judith (1993) To Brave Every Danger: the epic life of Mary Bryant of Fowey, highwaywoman and convicted felon, her transportation and amazing escape from Botany Bay. London: Macmillan 
 Currey, C. H. (1963) The Transportation, Escape and Pardoning of Mary Bryant (née Broad). Sydney: Angus and Robertson
Durand, John (2005) "The Odyssey of Mary B" Elkhorn WI 
Erickson, Carolly (2005) The Girl From Botany Bay. Hoboken, NJ.: John Wiley 
Hausman, Gerald & Loretta (2003) Escape from Botany Bay: the true story of Mary Bryant. New York: Orchard Books 
Hughes, Robert The Fatal Shore: a history of the transportation of convicts to Australia, 1787–1868. New York: Knopf 
Kampen, Anthony van (1968) Het leven van Mary Bryant. 3 vols.  Bussum: Unieboek NV (in Dutch)
King, Jonathan (2004) Mary Bryant: her life and escape from Botany Bay. Pymble, N.S.W.: Simon & Schuster Australia
MacKenzie, Charlotte (2021) Mary Broad the documentary Lulu.com 
Pearse, Lesley (2003) Remember Me. London: Michael Joseph (London: Penguin Books, 2004 ) (historical novel)
Pottle, Frederick A. (1938) Boswell and the Girl from Botany Bay. London: Heinemann
Preston, Diana (2017) Paradise in Chains: The Bounty Mutiny and the Founding of Australia. Bloomsbury Publishing USA 
Scutt, Craig (2007) Mary Bryant: The Impossible Escape. Fitzroy, Melbourne, Australia; Black Dog Books 
Veitch, Anthony Scott (1980) Spindrift, The Mary Bryant Story: a colonial saga. Australia: Angus & Robertson Publishers 
Walker, Mike (2005) A Long Way Home. Chichester; Hoboken, NJ: John Wiley

See also

 List of Australian criminals

References

Parish registers for Fowey, 1803–1970. Microfilm of original records in the Cornwall Record Office, Truro, Cornwall. Cornwall Record Office call nos.: DDP/66/1/9, 18, 21–23.
Cornwall parish registers, marriages. Vol. 8, p. 1–54 Phillimore, 1905
Devon Quarter Sessions. Epiphany 1786, DRO-QS32/73, Christmas Session 1786. Gaol Calendar.

External links
Mary Bryant movie at the Internet Movie Database
First Fleet Online at University of Wollongong
Mary Broad Christening and Family information from IGI

1765 births
Convicts transported to Australia on the First Fleet
People from Fowey
English highwaymen
Recipients of British royal pardons
Year of death unknown
Australian people of Cornish descent
British emigrants to Australia
Australian convict women
Convict escapees in Australia
British female criminals
Female
18th-century Australian women